Atascosa heitzmani is a species of snout moth in the genus Atascosa. It was described by Jay C. Shaffer in 1980, and is known from the US state of Missouri.

The forewings have a prominent white costal band with scattered reddish scales.

References

Anerastiini
Moths described in 1980
Moths of North America